Nostalgica is the seventh studio album from Australian vocal group The Ten Tenors, released in August 2008.

Reception
Matt Collar from AllMusic gave the album 3.5 out of 5 saying; "The Australian classical crossover ensemble celebrated their tenth anniversary with a collection of songs most frequently requested by their fans. Though they are known for covering more contemporary pop and rock songs by such bands as Queen and AC/DC, based on the songs included on Nostalgica, the Ten Tenors' fans prefer their more standards-oriented material."

Track listing

Charts

Weekly charts

Year-end charts

References

2008 albums
The Ten Tenors albums
Warner Records albums